Baškovce may refer to:

 Baškovce, Humenné District, Slovakia
 Baškovce, Sobrance District, Slovakia